The Free Church of Scotland was a Scottish denomination which was formed in 1843 by a large withdrawal from the established Church of Scotland in a schism known as the Disruption of 1843. In 1900, the vast majority of the Free Church of Scotland joined with the United Presbyterian Church of Scotland to form the United Free Church of Scotland (which itself mostly re-united with the Church of Scotland in 1929). In 1904, the House of Lords judged that the constitutional minority that did not enter the 1900 union were entitled to the whole of the church's patrimony, the Free Church of Scotland acquiesced in the division of those assets, between itself and those who had entered the union, by a Royal Commission in 1905. Despite the late founding date, Free Church of Scotland leadership claims an unbroken succession of leaders going all the way back to the Apostles.

Origins

The Free Church was formed by Evangelicals who broke from the Establishment of the Church of Scotland in 1843 in protest against what they regarded as the state's encroachment on the spiritual independence of the Church. Leading up to the Disruption many of the issues were discussed from an evangelical position in Hugh Miller's widely circulating newspaper The Witness. Of the driving personalities behind the Disruption Thomas Chalmers was probably the most influential with Robert Candlish perhaps second. Alexander Murray Dunlop, the church lawyer, was also very involved.

The Disruption of 1843 was a bitter, nationwide division which split the established Church of Scotland. It was larger than the previous historical secessions of 1733 or 1761. The evangelical element had been demanding the purification of the Church, and it attacked the patronage system, which allowed rich landowners to select the local ministers. It became a political battle between evangelicals on one side and the "Moderates" and gentry on the other. The evangelicals secured passage by the church's General Assembly in 1834, of the "Veto Act", asserting that, as a fundamental law of the Church, no pastor should be forced by the gentry upon a congregation contrary to the popular will, and that any nominee could be rejected by majority of the heads of families. This direct blow at the right of private patrons was challenged in the civil courts, and was decided (1838) against the evangelicals. In 1843, 450 evangelical ministers (out of 1,200 ministers in all) broke away, and formed the Free Church of Scotland. 

Led by Dr. Thomas Chalmers (1780–1847), a third of the membership walked out, including nearly all the Gaelic-speakers and the missionaries, and most of the Highlanders. The established Church kept all the properties, buildings and endowments. The seceders created a voluntary fund of over £400,000 to build 700 new churches; 400 manses (residences for the ministers) were erected at a cost of £250,000; and an equal or larger amount was expended on the building of 500 parochial schools, as well as a college in Edinburgh. After the passing of the Education Act of 1872, most of these schools were voluntarily transferred to the newly established public school-boards.

Chalmers' ideas shaped the breakaway group. He stressed a social vision that revived and preserved Scotland's communal traditions at a time of strain on the social fabric of the country. Chalmers's idealised small equalitarian, kirk-based, self-contained communities that recognised the individuality of their members and the need for co-operation. That vision also affected the mainstream Presbyterian churches, and by the 1870s it had been assimilated by the established Church of Scotland. Chalmers's ideals demonstrated that the church was concerned with the problems of urban society, and they represented a real attempt to overcome the social fragmentation that took place in industrial towns and cities.

Nature

Finances

The first task of the new church was to provide income for her initial 500 ministers and places of worship for her people. As she aspired to be the national church of the Scottish people, she set herself the ambitious task of establishing a presence in every parish in Scotland (except in the Highlands, where FC ministers were initially in short supply.) Sometimes land owners were less than helpful such as at Strontian, where the church took to a boat.

The building programme produced 470 new churches within a year and over 700 by 1847. Manses and over 700 schools soon followed. This programme was made possible by extraordinary financial generosity, which came from the Evangelical awakening and the wealth of the emerging middle class.

The church created a Sustentation Fund, the brainchild of Thomas Chalmers, to which congregations contributed according to their means, and from which all ministers received an 'equal dividend'. This fund provided a modest income for 583 ministers in 1843/4, and by 1900 was able to provide an income for nearly 1200. This centralising and sharing of resources was previously unknown within the Protestant churches in Scotland, but later became the norm.

"Send back the money" campaign
In their original fundraising activities the Free Church sent "missionaries" to the United States, where they found some slave-owners particularly supportive. However, the church having accepted £3,000 in donations from this source, they were later denounced as unchristian by some abolitionists. Some Free Churchmen like George Buchan, William Collins, John Wilson and Henry Duncan themselves campaigned for the ultimate abolition of slavery. When Frederick Douglass arrived in Scotland he became a vocal proponent of the "Send back the money" campaign which urged the Free Church to return the £3,000 donation. In his autobiography "My Bondage and My Freedom" Douglass (p. 386) writes: "The Free Church held on to the blood-stained money, and continued to justify itself in its position – and of course to apologize for slavery – and does so till this day. She lost a glorious opportunity for giving her voice, her vote, and her example to the cause of humanity ; and to-day she is staggering under the curse of the enslaved, whose blood is in her skirts." Douglass spoke at three meetings in Dundee in 1846. In 1844, long before Douglass's arrival, Robert Candlish had spoken against slavery in a debate about a man named John Brown. In 1847 he is quoted as saying, from the floor of the Free Church Assembly: "Never, never, let this church, or this country, cease to testify that slavery is sin, and that it must bring down on the sinners, whether they be in Congress assembled, or as individuals throughout the land, the just judgement of Almighty God." Not all American Presbyterians shared his anti-slavery view, although some did both in the north and the south. Presbyterian thinker B. B. Warfield regarded the integration of freed slaves as one of the largest problems America had ever faced. An official letter from the Free Church did reach the Assembly of the Southern Presbyterian Church in May 1847. The official Free Church position was described as being "very strongly against slavery".

Theology

Great importance was attached to maintaining an educated ministry within the Free Church. Because the established Church of Scotland controlled the divinity faculties of the universities, the Free Church set up its own colleges. New College was opened in 1850 with five chairs: Systematic Theology, Apologetics and Practical Theology, Church History, Hebrew and Old Testament, and New Testament 
Exegesis. The Free Church also set up Christ's College in Aberdeen in 1856 and Trinity College in Glagow followed later. The first generation of teachers were enthusiastic proponents of Westminster Calvinism.

For example, David Welsh was an early professor. James Buchanan followed Thomas Chalmers as professor of Systematic Theology when he died in 1847. James Bannerman was appointed to the chair of Apologetics and Pastoral Theology and his The Church of Christ volumes 1 and 2 were widely read. William Cunningham was one of the early Church History professors. John "Rabbi" Duncan was an early professor of Hebrew. Other chairs were added such as the Missionary Chair of Duff.

This position was subsequently abandoned, as theologians such as A. B. Bruce, Marcus Dods and George Adam Smith began to teach a more liberal understanding of the faith. 'Believing criticism' of the Bible was a central approach taught by such as William Robertson Smith and he was dismissed from his chair by the Assembly in 1881. Attempts were made between 1890 and 1895 to bring many of these professors to the bar of the Assembly on charges of heresy, but these moves failed, with only minor warnings being issued.

In 1892 the Free Church, following the example of the United Presbyterian Church and the Church of Scotland, and with union with those denominations as the goal, passed a Declaratory Act relaxing the standard of subscription to the confession. This had the result that a small number of congregations and even fewer ministers, mostly in the Highlands, severed their connection with the church and formed the Free Presbyterian Church of Scotland. Others with similar theological views waited for imminent union but chose to continue with the Free Church.

Activity

The Free Church of Scotland became very active in foreign missions. Many of the staff from the established Church of Scotland's India mission adhered to the Free Church. The church soon also established herself in Africa, with missionaries such as James Stewart (1831-1905) and with the co-operation of Robert Laws (1851-1934) of the United Presbyterian Church, as well as becoming involved in evangelisation of the Jews. Her focus on mission resulted in one of the largest missionary organisations in the world. Preachers like William Chalmers Burns worked in Canada and China. Alexander Duff and John Anderson worked in India. Duff can be seen behind Hugh Miller in the Disruption Painting signing Missions in Bengal. There were missions related to the Free Church and visited by Duff at Lake Nyassa in Africa and in the Lebanon.

The early Free Church was also concerned with educational reform including setting up Free Church schools. Members of the Free Church also became associated with the colonisation of New Zealand: the Free Church offshoot the Otago Association sent out emigrants in 1847 who established the Otago settlement in 1848. Thomas Burns was one of the first churchmen in the colony which developed into Dunedin.

The importance of Home Missions also grew, these having the purpose of increasing church attendance, particularly amongst the poorer communities in large cities. Thomas Chalmers led the way with a territorial mission in Edinburgh's West Port (1844- ), which epitomised his idea of a "godly commonwealth". Free churchmen were at the forefront of the 1859 Revival as well as of the Moody and Sankey's campaign of 1873–1875 in Britain. However, Chalmers's social ideas were never fully realised, as the gap between the church and the urban masses continued to increase.

Towards the end of the 19th century, Free Churches sanctioned the use of instrumental music. An association formed in 1891 to promote order and reverence in public services. In 1898 it published A New Directory for Public Worship which, while not providing set forms of prayer, offered directions. The Free Church took an interest in hymnology and church music, which led to the production of its hymnbook.

Unions and relationships with other Presbyterians

From its inception, the Free Church claimed it was the authentic Church of Scotland. Constitutionally, despite the Disruption, she continued to support the establishment principle. However some joined the United Presbyterian Church in calling for the disestablishment of the Church of Scotland.

In 1852 the Original Secession Church joined the Free Church; in 1876 most of the Reformed Presbyterian Church followed suit. However, a leadership-led attempt to unite with the United Presbyterians was not successful. These attempts began as early as 1863 when the Free Church began talks with the UPC with a view to a union. However, a report laid before the Assembly of 1864 showed that the two churches were not agreed as to the relationship between state and church. The Free Church maintained that national resources could be used in aid of the church, provided that the state abstain from all interference in its internal government. The United Presbyterians held that, as the state had no authority in spiritual things, it was not within its jurisdiction to legislate as to what was true in religion, prescribe a creed or any form of worship for its subjects, or to endow the church from national resources. Any union would therefore have to leave this question open. At the time this difference was sufficient to preclude the union being pursued.

In the following years the Free Church Assembly showed increasing willingness for union on these open terms. However, the 'establishment' minority prevented a successful conclusion during the years between 1867 and 1873. After negotiations failed in 1873, the two churches agreed a 'Mutual Eligibility Act' enabling a congregation of one denomination to call a minister from the other.

During this period the antidisestablishmentarian party continued to shrink and became increasingly alienated. This decline was hastened when some congregations left to form the Free Presbyterian Church of Scotland in 1893.

Starting in 1895, union began to be officially discussed once more. A joint committee made up of men from both denominations noted remarkable agreement on doctrinal standards, rules and methods. After a few concessions from both sides, a common constitution was agreed. However, a minority in the Free Church Assembly protested, and threatened to test its legality in the courts.

The respective assemblies of the churches met for the last time on 30 October 1900. On the following day the union was completed, and the United Free Church of Scotland came into being.

However, a minority of those who dissented remained outside the union, claiming that they were the true Free Church and that the majority had departed from the church when they formed the United Free Church. After a protracted legal battle, the House of Lords found in favour of the minority (in spite of the belief of most that the true kirk is above the state) and awarded them the right to keep the name Free Church of Scotland, though the majority was able to keep most of the financial resources. (See Free Church of Scotland for the history of the continuing body.)

Moderators of the General Assembly

It is noted that duplicates appear in 1866 and 1867.

Thomas Chalmers (May 1843)
Thomas Brown (October 1843)
Henry Grey (1844)
Patrick MacFarlan (1845) Gaelic Moderator John Macdonald
Robert James Brown (1846)
James Sievewright (1847)
Patrick Clason (1848)
Mackintosh MacKay (1849)
Nathaniel Paterson (1850)
Alexander Duff (1851)
Angus Makellar (1852)
John Smyth (1853)
James Grierson (1854)
James Henderson (1855)
Thomas M'Crie the Younger (1856)
James Julius Wood (1857)
Alexander Beith (1858)
William Cunningham (1859)
Robert Buchanan (1860)
Robert Smith Candlish (1861)
Thomas Guthrie (1862)
Roderick McLeod (1863)
Patrick Fairbairn (1864)
James Begg (1865)
William Wilson (1866)
John Roxburgh (1866 or 1867)
Robert Smith Candlish (1867)
William Nixon (1868)
Henry Wellwood Moncreiff (1869)
John Wilson (1870)
Robert Elder (1871)
Charles John Brown (1872)
Alexander Duff (1873) the only person to serve a second term
Robert Walter Stewart (1874)
Alexander Moody Stuart (1875)
Thomas McLauchlan (1876)
William Henry Goold (1877)
Andrew Bonar (1878)
James Chalmers Burns (1879)
Thomas Main (1880)
William Laughton (1881)
Robert MacDonald (minister) (1882)
Horatius Bonar (1883)
Walter Ross Taylor (1884)
David Brown (1885)
Alexander Neil Somerville (1886)
Robert Rainy (1887)
Gustavus Aird (1888) (the only year the Assembly was solely in Inverness)
John Laird (1889)
Thomas Brown (1890)
Thomas Smith (1891)
William Garden Blaikie (1892)
Walter Chalmers Smith (1893)
George Douglas (1894)
James Hood Wilson (1895)
William Miller (1896)
Hugh Macmillan (1897)
Alexander Whyte (1898)
James Stewart (1899)
Walter Ross Taylor (1900)

Gaelic Moderators
For certain years a separate Gaelic Moderator served at a separate Assembly in Inverness. This had advantages of allowing northern ministers to travel less to the Assembly. It did however create a division. In this division it was largely the northern ministers who remained in the Free Church following the Union of 1900. Known Gaelic Moderators are:

Rev John MacDonald (1845)
Gustavus Aird (1888)

Other areas

The Free Church were spread the length and breadth of Scotland and also had churches in the northmost sectors of England and several churches in London. Their influence in other countries focused on Canada and New Zealand, where there were a high proportion of Scots. They ran a specific recruitment campaign to get Free Church ministers to go to New Zealand. Moderators in New Zealand included:

Gordon Webster (1898)

Prince Edward Island, Canada, retains a number of Free Churches of Scotland affiliated with the Synod in Scotland as missionary churches. This alliance was established by the Moderator of the Free Church of Scotland, Rev. Ewen MacDougall, in the 1930s, at the time of the establishment of the Presbyterian Church in Canada and the subsequent establishment of the United Church of Canada. The large enclave of Free Church of Scotland congregations has been attributed to a religious revival under the preaching of Rev. Donald MacDonald. The extant Church of Scotland congregations of Prince Edward Island, Canada, continue to adhere to a simple form of worship with a focus on a biblical exegesis from the pulpit, singing of the Psalms and biblical paraphrases without accompaniment or choir, led by a chanter, and prayer. The houses of worship remain simple with minimal embellishment.

See also
Religion in the United Kingdom

References

Notes

Bibliography
 Brown, Stewart J. Thomas Chalmers and the Godly Commonwealth in Scotland (1982)
 Cameron, N. et al. (eds) Dictionary of Scottish Church History and Theology, Edinburgh T&T Clark 1993
 Devine, T. M. The Scottish Nation (1999) ch 16
 Drummond, Andrew Landale, and James Bulloch. The Church in Victorian Scotland, 1843–1874 (Saint Andrew Press, 1975)
 Ewing, William, Annals of the Free Church of Scotland, 1843-1900, T. & T. Clark, Edinburgh, 1914, with Supplementary Information
 Finlayson, Alexander Unity and diversity: the founders of the Free Church of Scotland, Fearn, Ross-shire, Great Britain, Christian Focus, 2010.

 Mechie, S. The Church and Scottish Social Development, 1780–1870 (1960)
 

Presbyterianism in Scotland
Religious organizations established in 1843
1843 establishments in Scotland
1900 disestablishments in Scotland

de:Free Church of Scotland
sv:Skotska frikyrkan